Aleta Mitchell is an American film, television and theatre actress

Career

Filmography
She has appeared in films including

 1986 No Mercy (directed by Richard Pearce) as Cara
 1988 The Serpent and the Rainbow (directed by Wes Craven) as Celestine Durand
 1989 Valmont (directed by Miloš Forman) as Victoire
 1992 Malcolm X (directed by Spike Lee) as Sister Robin
 1997 Midnight in the Garden of Good and Evil (directed by Clint Eastwood) as Alphabette
 1998 O.K. Garage (directed by Brandon Cole) as Louise

Television work
Mitchell has also appeared in television series including

 1985 The Cosby Show as Mrs. Randall
 1991-1994 Law & Order as Helene Carter / Joanne Preston

Theatre
She has appeared in various Off Broadway- and on Broadway in Ma Rainey's Black Bottom (1984).

References

External links
 
 
  (archive)

Year of birth missing (living people)
American film actresses
American television actresses
American stage actresses
Living people
21st-century American women